Kanwal Bharti (born 4 February 1953) is an Indian Dalit writer and columnist.

Background and education 
Kanwal Bharti, the son of a cobbler, was born and raised in the slums of the Rampur district of Uttar Pradesh.

Arrest 
Bharti was arrested on 6 August 2013 for criticizing the stand of the Government of Uttar Pradesh in the Durga Nagpal case. On 16 August 2013, the Supreme Court of India asked the Government of Uttar Pradesh to clarify their justification for Bharti's arrest.

Books 

Periyar Dashan Chintan Sacchi Ramayan (2020)
RSS Aur Bahujan Chintan (2019)
Jati ka Vinash (2018)
The case for Bahujan Literature (2017)
Chandrika Prasad Jigyasu (2016)
Kabir Ek Vishleshan (2015)
Kashiram key do chehre (2013)

References

External links 
 Kanwal Bharti on Facebook
 
 
 

1953 births
Living people
Dalit writers
People from Rampur, Uttar Pradesh
Writers from Uttar Pradesh
Indian columnists
20th-century Indian poets
Indian male poets
20th-century Indian male writers